The small-headed frog or tiny oriental frog (Occidozyga diminutiva) is a species of frog in the family Dicroglossidae.
It is endemic to the Philippines where it is found on Mindanao (including Mount Malindang), Basilan, and in the Sulu Archipelago.

Description
Occidozyga diminutiva is a small stocky frog, not exceeding  in body length. Skin of back and head is smooth or faintly shagreened. Tympanum is completely hidden or with only anterior rim visible. Toes are incompletely webbed and nostrils are lateral (these characters can be used to distinguish it from Occidozyga laevis with completely webbed toes and superior nostrils).

Habitat
Its habitats are streams and quiet pools of water in undisturbed and disturbed lowland forests. This common frog is declining; it is threatened by habitat loss (loss of lowland rainforests and the pollution of mountain streams and rivers).

References

Occidozyga
Amphibians of the Philippines
Endemic fauna of the Philippines
Fauna of Mindanao
Fauna of Basilan
Fauna of Sulu
Fauna of Tawi-Tawi
Taxonomy articles created by Polbot
Amphibians described in 1922